We All Fall Down is a 1997 Italian independent comedy film directed by Davide Ferrario. It is based on the novel Tutti giù per terra by Giuseppe Culicchia.

The film premiered at the 1997 Locarno International Film Festival, in which Valerio Mastandrea was awarded Best Actor.

Cast 
 Valerio Mastandrea: Walter
 Caterina Caselli: Caterina
 Benedetta Mazzini: Valeria
 Anita Caprioli Beatrice
 Carlo Monni: father of Walter
 Adriana Rinaldi: mother of Walter
 Luciana Littizzetto: post office assistant 
 Giovanni Lindo Ferretti: member of the examination committee
 Vladimir Luxuria: prostitute
 Roberto Accornero: professor

References

External links

1997 films
1997 comedy films
Italian comedy films
Films directed by Davide Ferrario
1990s Italian-language films
1990s Italian films